Rubén Óscar Valdez Ferrero (born 25 June 1946) is a former Spanish footballer striker. He played the majority of his career for Spanish club Valencia C.F. and also represented the Spain national team.

Early life
Valdez was born in Buenos Aires, Argentina.

Career

Club career
Valdez began his playing career in 1967 with Almirante Brown of the Argentine 2nd division. In 1969, he joined Club Atlético Platense of the Primera División where he played 54 games and scored 12 goals in his time at the club.

In 1971, he was signed by Valencia C.F. of Spain, he won the Spanish league championship with the club in his first season. He played for the club until 1978 making 195 appearances and scoring 51 goals all competitions. Between 1977 and 1978 he played alongside fellow Argentine striker Mario Kempes.

In 1979 Valdez left Valencia to play for CD Castellón but before the end of the year he had returned to Argentina to join Kimberley where he made 5 appearances, including a famous 2-1 victory against River Plate on 9 September 1979. before his retirement at the end of the year.

International career
Valdez was first selected to play for Spain in 1972. He made his debut in a 2-0 home win against Uruguay on 23 May 1972, in which he scored one of the goals. His final international appearance came on 13 February 1974 in a 1-0 defeat to Yugoslavia in Frankfurt in a qualification game for the 1974 FIFA World Cup.

Titles
La Liga (1): 1970-71

Legacy
Platense have a filial club in Spain which has adopted the name Peña Calamar Óscar Valdez in his honour.

See also
List of Spain international footballers born outside Spain

References

External links

Footballers from Buenos Aires
Spanish footballers
Spain international footballers
Argentine footballers
Argentine emigrants to Spain
Association football forwards
Club Atlético Platense footballers
Valencia CF players
CD Castellón footballers
Argentine football managers
Valencia CF Mestalla managers
Valencia CF managers
Paraguay national football team managers
Expatriate football managers in Paraguay
1946 births
Living people
CF Gandía managers
CP Almería managers
La Liga players
Segunda División players
Segunda División B managers
La Liga managers
Tercera División managers